Outwell Basin railway station was a stop on the Wisbech and Upwell Tramway in Outwell, Norfolk. It opened in 1883 carrying passenger and goods traffic from nearby farms. It was closed to passengers in 1928, with goods services continuing on the line until 1966. The line it once stood on is now a grassy track.

References

Disused railway stations in Norfolk
Former Wisbech and Upwell Tramway stations
Railway stations in Great Britain opened in 1883
Railway stations in Great Britain closed in 1928